Mihailo Jovičić (born January 24, 1999) is a Serbian professional basketball player for SPD Radnički of the Second Basketball League of Serbia.

Early life 
Jovičić started his basketball career playing with the youth teams of SK Foka from Kragujevac. In June 2014, at 15 years of age, he to Madrid, Spain where he played for the Real Madrid B. He played for Real Madrid cadet and junior team until 2016 when he went back to Serbia. In 2016–17 season, Jovičić played the Euroleague Basketball Next Generation Tournament for the Mega Leks U18 .

Professional career 
On January 30, 2017, Jovičić signed the first professional contract with the Mega Leks. He made his Adriatic League debut on October 1, 2017 in a home win against KK Cibona.

On 18 June 2021, Jovičić signed a multi-year contract with Podgorica.

References

External links 
 Profile at eurobasket.com
 Profile at realgm.com
 Profile at proballers.com
 Profile at aba-liga.com

1999 births
Living people
ABA League players
Basketball League of Serbia players
KK Mega Basket players
KK Podgorica players
OKK Beograd players
Serbian men's basketball players
Serbian expatriate basketball people in Montenegro
Serbian expatriate basketball people in Spain
Sportspeople from Kragujevac
Point guards